Jiujing Hani Ethnic Township is an ethnic township in Lancang Lahu Autonomous County, Yunnan, China.

Etymology
In late Qing dynasty (1644–1911), the region was rich in wine, hence the name "Jiujing".

Administrative division
As of 2016, the township is divided into four villages: 
Jiufang 
Yanyin 
Shuifang 
Menggen

History
It came under the jurisdiction of Tudusi in the Qing dynasty (1644–1911).

In 1940, it was under the jurisdiction of the 1st District and then became Jiujing Township.

From 1949 to 1968, it was known as "Jiujing District". In 1969, it was renamed "Weidong Commune" and then "Jiujing Commune" in 1972. It was formed as a township in 1988.

Geography
The township is situated at southern Lancang Lahu Autonomous County. The township is bordered to the north by Menglang Town, to the east by Nuozhadu Town, to the south by Huimin Town, and to the west by Donghui Town and Nuofu Township.

Economy
The economy of the township has a predominantly agricultural orientation, including farming, ranching and pig-breeding. Commercial crops include tea, sugarcane, and coffee bean.

Demographics

As of 2017, the National Bureau of Statistics of China estimates the township's population now to be 14,065.

Transportation
The National Highway G214 passes across the township north to south.

References

Bibliography

Townships of Pu'er City
Divisions of Lancang Lahu Autonomous County